Veliyam Bharghavan (‎; May 1928 – 18 September 2013) was a Communist leader from the Kerala, India. He was the state Secretary of Communist Party of India (CPI) from 1998 to 2010. In 2010 he retired from that position due to his health issues. He hails from Veliyam village of Kollam district. He was an advocate of a merger between CPI and Communist Party of India (Marxist) (CPM). He was a member of the first Legislative Assembly of Kerala, winning the 1957 and 1960(interim) assembly elections from the Chadayamangalam Constituency. He died on 18 September 2013 aged 85 due to respiratory and cardiac problems.

See also
 Communist Party of India

References

Communist Party of India politicians from Kerala
Politicians from Kollam district
Sree Narayana College, Kollam alumni
1928 births
2013 deaths
Kerala MLAs 1957–1959
Kerala MLAs 1960–1964